Nõva is a village in Lääne-Nigula Parish Lääne County, on the northwestern coast of Estonia. It was the administrative centre of Nõva Parish. Nõva has a population of 136 as of 2010.

Nõva was first mentioned in 1402 as Neyve, the name is believed to originate from the same Finno-Ugric root which has given a name to Neva River.

Nõva is home to wooden St. Olaf's church which was built somewhere in the 18th century. Educator and publisher Friedrich Brandt (1830–1890) served as a sacristan in Nõva in the 1870s.

Swedish politician Ilmar Reepalu was born in Nõva in 1943.

References

Villages in Lääne County
Kreis Harrien